Andreas Beck was the defending champion, but lost in the second round.

Nicolas Mahut won the title, defeating Yūichi Sugita in the final, 3–6, 7–6(7–3), 6–4.

Seeds

Draw

Finals

Top half

Bottom half

References
 Main Draw
 Qualifying Draw

Open Harmonie mutuelle - Singles
2015 Singles